Stygitropha is a genus of moths belonging to the subfamily Olethreutinae of the family Tortricidae.

Species
Stygitropha funebris Diakonoff, 1983
Stygitropha minys  Razowski & Wojtusiak, 2013
Stygitropha phaios  Razowski & Wojtusiak, 2013

See also
List of Tortricidae genera

References

External links
tortricidae.com

Tortricidae genera
Olethreutinae
Taxa named by Alexey Diakonoff